Trombidium rhopalicus is a species of mite in the genus Trombidium in the family Trombidiidae. It is found in Germany. The larvae of this species are ectoparasites on the pteromalid wasp Rhopalicus tutela, which itself is a parasite of bark beetles.

References
 Synopsis of the described Arachnida of the World: Trombidiidae

Further reading
  (1967): Atomus rhopalicus n. sp., a parasite of Rhopalicus tutela (Walker)(Hymenoptera), from Germany (Trombidiidae: Acarina). Opuscula Zool. 95.

Trombidiidae
Endemic fauna of Germany
Parasites of Hymenoptera
Parasitic acari
Animals described in 1967